Psycho-Oncology is a monthly peer-reviewed medical journal covering psycho-oncology, that is, the psychological aspects of oncology. It was established in 1992 and is published monthly by Wiley-Blackwell, Hoboken, New Jersey. The editor-in-chief is Maggie Watson (University College London). According to the Journal Citation Reports, the journal has a 2017 impact factor of 3.455.

References

External links

Oncology journals
Psychology journals
Publications established in 1992
Monthly journals
Wiley-Blackwell academic journals
English-language journals